Nahyan Saeed (Arabic:نهيان سعيد, born 20 June 1996) is an Emirati footballer who plays as a midfielder.

Career
Nahyan Saeed started his career at Masafi and is a product of the Masafi's youth system. and after hem played for Dibba, and Al Urooba.

References

External links
 

1996 births
Living people
Emirati footballers
Masafi Club players
Dibba FC players
Al Urooba Club players
Dibba Al-Hisn Sports Club players
UAE Pro League players
UAE First Division League players
Association football midfielders
Place of birth missing (living people)